The Abia State Ministry of Information and Strategy is the state government ministry that informs the public about
government policy plans and implementation and supports improvements to knowledge and education of the public.

See also
Abia State Government

References

Government ministries of Abia State